Dubrovsky is a rural locality (a settlement) in Posyolok Velikodvorsky, Gus-Khrustalny District, Vladimir Oblast, Russia. The population was 14 as of 2010.

Geography 
The village is located 11 km north from Velikodvorsky, 45 km south from Gus-Khrustalny.

References 

Rural localities in Gus-Khrustalny District